Roger Carroll Garis ( – ) was an American writer. He wrote for magazines and also writer The Outboard Boys series of books. In addition to his writing of books for children and adults, he contributed to the Waterbury, Connecticut Republican and wrote for the stage and for television.

Biography   
His father, Howard R. Garis, and his mother, Lilian Garis, were very popular authors in their day, writing hundreds of books under their own names, as well as pseudonyms.

Garis was born in Newark, New Jersey, and attended Princeton University and Columbia University, but received his law degree from New Jersey Law School. Garis also wrote several books under pseudonyms for the Stratemeyer Syndicate, as did his parents.

Garis' sister, Cleo F., also wrote a three-book series concurrently with his Outboard Boys series.

Roger Garis' daughter, Leslie Garis, wrote a memoir of the family, The House of Happy Endings (Farrar, Straus and Giroux, 2007).

Publications

Books
 The Outboard Boys At Mystery Island [f|1933]
 The Outboard Boys At Shadow Lake [f|1933]
 The Outboard Boys At Pirate Beach [f|1933]
 The Outboard Boys At Shark River [f|1934]
 Amusement Park (D. Appleton-Century, New York/London) [f|1934]
 Never Take Candy From A Stranger [f|1961]
 My Father Was Uncle Wiggily 1966

Movies
 Never Take Sweets from a Stranger (1960) at imdb.com

External links

 
The Outboard Boys at Shark River full text
Roger Garis Papers at Syracuse University
 

1901 births
1967 deaths
American children's writers